Brechmorhoga is a genus of dragonfly in the Libellulidae family. 
Members of this genus are commonly called clubskimmers because of the widening abdominal segments much like the clubtails.

The genus contains the following species:
Brechmorhoga archboldi 
Brechmorhoga diplosema 
Brechmorhoga flavoannulata 
Brechmorhoga flavopunctata 
Brechmorhoga innupta 
Brechmorhoga latialata 
Brechmorhoga mendax  – pale-faced clubskimmer
Brechmorhoga neblinae 
Brechmorhoga nubecula 
Brechmorhoga pertinax  – masked clubskimmer
Brechmorhoga praecox  – slender clubskimmer
Brechmorhoga praedatrix 
Brechmorhoga rapax 
Brechmorhoga tepeaca 
Brechmorhoga travassosi 
Brechmorhoga vivax

References

Libellulidae
Taxa named by William Forsell Kirby
Anisoptera genera